Hans Moks (15 October 1926 – 11 October 2011) was an Estonian-Canadian athletics competitor.

He was born in Sootaga Rural Municipality. In 1942 he graduated from Hugo Treffner Gymnasium. In 1944 he fled to Sweden. In 1954 he moved to Canada.

He began his sporting career at the age of 14. He focused on javelin throw. 1952–1958 he was the best javelin thrower in Canada. He won bronze medal at 1958 British Empire and Commonwealth Games. His record was 72.78 (1955).

References

1926 births
2011 deaths
Estonian male javelin throwers
Canadian male javelin throwers
Estonian World War II refugees
Estonian emigrants to Canada
Hugo Treffner Gymnasium alumni
People from Tartu Parish
Athletes (track and field) at the 1958 British Empire and Commonwealth Games
Commonwealth Games bronze medallists for Canada
Commonwealth Games medallists in athletics
Medallists at the 1958 British Empire and Commonwealth Games